The 2004 Eastbourne Borough Council election took place on 10 June 2004 to elect members of Eastbourne Borough Council in East Sussex, England. One third of the council was up for election and the Conservative Party gained overall control of the council from the Liberal Democrats.

After the election, the composition of the council was:
Conservative 14
Liberal Democrats 13

Background
10 seats were contested at the election, with 2 seats being available in Old Town ward after Liberal Democrat councillor Bert Leggett stood down.

During the campaign both the national Liberal Democrat leader Charles Kennedy and Conservative leader Michael Howard came to Eastbourne to support their parties.

Election result
The Conservatives gained a seat from the Liberal Democrats to take a one-seat majority on the council with 14 councillors, compared to 13 for the Liberal Democrats. The Conservative gain came in Old Town ward, where Conservative Simon Herbert gained one of the two seats from the Liberal Democrats with 1,926 votes, while Liberal Democrat Maurice Skilton held the other seat with 1,854 votes. Overall turnout at the election was 40.97%, up from 33.6% at the 2003 election.

Ward results

References

2004
2004 English local elections
2000s in East Sussex